Hezar Mani-ye Sofla (also Romanized as Hezār Manī-ye Soflá; also known as Hezār Manī) is a village in Howmeh-ye Sharqi Rural District, in the Central District of Ramhormoz County, Khuzestan Province, Iran. At the 2006 census, its population was 100, in 21 families.

References 

Populated places in Ramhormoz County